Rakhine, also known as Arakanese, is a language of western Myanmar that is closely related to Burmese. Native to the Rakhine, Marma and Kamein peoples, it is spoken as a first language by one million people, and as a second language by a further million.

According to speakers of standard Burmese, Arakanese has an intelligibility of seventy-five percent with Burmese. Thus, it is often considered to be a unique dialect or variety of Burmese. As there are no universally accepted criteria for distinguishing a language from a dialect, scholars and other interested parties often disagree about the linguistic, historical and social status of Arakanese. There are three dialecst of Arakanese: Sittwe–Marma (about two thirds of speakers), Ramree, and Thandwe.

Vocabulary
While Arakanese and Standard Burmese share the majority of lexicon, Arakanese has numerous vocabulary differences. Some are native words with no cognates in Standard Burmese, like 'sarong' ( in Standard Burmese,  in Arakanese). Others are loan words from Bengali, English, and Hindi, not found in Standard Burmese. An example is 'hospital', which is called  in Standard Burmese, but is called  (pronounced ) in Arakanese, from English sick lines. Moreover, some archaic words in Standard Burmese are preferred in Arakanese.

Comparison
A gloss of vocabulary differences between Standard Burmese and Arakanese is below:

Phonology
The phonological system described here is the inventory of sounds, represented using the International Phonetic Alphabet (IPA).

Consonants 
The consonants of Arakanese are:

Because Arakanese has preserved the  sound, the  medial (which is preserved in writing in Standard Burmese with the diacritic ) is still distinguished in the following Arakanese consonant clusters: . For example, the word "blue," spelt , is pronounced  in standard Burmese, but pronounced  in Arakanese. Moreover, there is less voicing in Arakanese than in Standard Burmese, occurring only when the consonant is unaspirated.

Vowels 
The vowels of Arakanese are:

While Arakanese shares the same set of vowels as Burmese, Arakanese rhymes also diverge from Standard Burmese for a number of open syllables and closed syllables. Hence, a word like 'blood', which is spelt , pronounced in standard Burmese, is pronounced  in Arakanese. Similarly, Arakanese has a number of closed syllable rhymes that do not exist in Standard Burmese, including .

Differences from standard Burmese 
The following is a summary of consonantal, vowel and rhyme differences from Standard Burmese found in the Arakanese dialect:

Writing system
Arakanese is written using the Burmese script, which descends from Southern Brahmi. Rakhine speakers are taught Rakhine pronunciations using written Burmese, while most Marma speakers are only literate in Bengali. 

The first extant Arakanese inscriptions, the Launggrak Taung Maw inscription and the Mahathi Crocodile Rock inscription (1356), date to the 1300s, and the epigraphic record of Arakanese inscriptions is unevenly distributed between the 1400s to 1800s. In the early 1400s, Arakanese inscriptions began to transition from the square letters associated with stone inscriptions (kyauksa), to rounder letters that is now standard for the Burmese script. This coincided with developments in Arakanese literature, which was stimulated by the rise of Mrauk Oo during the 1400s. 

Modern-day Rakhine State is home to Sanskrit inscriptions that date from the first millennium to the 1000s, and were written in Northern Brahmic scripts (namely Siddham or Gaudi), which are ancestral to the Bengali script. These inscriptions are not ancestral to Arakanese epigraphy, which uses a Southern Brahmi script much like Burmese and Mon. While some Arakanese have coined the term Rakkhawanna to reference a script that predates the usage of written Burmese, there is no contemporary lithic evidence to support the existence of such a script.

References

Bibliography

External links

Burmish languages
Languages of Myanmar
Languages of Bangladesh
Languages of India